Nagar College, established on 1998, is a general degree college of Nagar in Murshidabad district of West Bengal, India. It offers undergraduate courses in arts and science. It is affiliated with the university of Kalyani. Syed Abdur Razzaque founded the college. The late Syed Ali Zaker founded Nagar Aziza Memorial High School in memory of his deceased daughter, Aziza. As mentioned in the trust deed, executed by the late Syed Ali Zaker, his son, Syed Abdur Razzaque, the Secretary of Nagar Aziza Memorial High School, took initiative on the college. He visited more than 250 villages, gathering contributions. After the recognition of the college, Syed Abdur Razzaque became the first President of the Governing Body and his son Syed Rajiul Mahabub is the only donor member on the Governing Body.

Departments

Science
Mathematics
Physics

Arts
Bengali
(Honours & general)
English
(Honours & general)
Arabic
History
Geography
Political science
Philosophy
Economics
Physical education
Sanskrit
Education (general)
Computer science

See also
List of institutions of higher education in West Bengal
Education in India
Education in West Bengal

References

External links
Nagar College
University of Kalyani
University Grants Commission
National Assessment and Accreditation Council

Colleges affiliated to University of Kalyani
Universities and colleges in Murshidabad district
Educational institutions established in 1998
1998 establishments in West Bengal